The women's 60 metres hurdles event  at the 1996 European Athletics Indoor Championships was held in Stockholm Globe Arena on 10 March.

Medalists

Results

Heats
The winner of each heat (Q) and the next 3 fastest (q) qualified for the final.

Final

References

60 metres hurdles at the European Athletics Indoor Championships
60 hurdles
1996 in women's athletics